Phoenice was a province of the Roman Empire, encompassing the historical region of Phoenicia. It was officially created in 194 AD and after , Phoenice Syria was divided into Phoenice proper or Phoenice Paralia, and Phoenice Libanensis, a division that persisted until the region was conquered by the Muslim Arabs in the 630s.

Administrative history 

Phoenicia came under Roman rule in 64 BC, when Pompey created the province of Syria. With the exception of a brief period in 36–30 BC, when Mark Antony gave the region to Ptolemaic Egypt, Phoenicia remained part of the province of Syria thereafter. Emperor Hadrian (reigned 117–138) is said to have considered a division of the overly large Syrian province in 123–124 AD, but it was not until shortly after c. 194 AD that Septimius Severus (r. 193–211) actually undertook this, dividing the province into Syria Coele in the north and Syria Phoenice in the south. Tyre became the capital of the new province, but Elagabalus (r. 218–222) raised his native Emesa to co-capital, and the two cities rivalled each other as the head of the province until its division in the 4th century.

The province was much larger than the area traditionally called Phoenicia: for example, cities like Emesa and Palmyra and the base of the Legio III Gallica in Raphanaea were now subject to governor in Tyre. Veterans of this military unit were settled in Tyre, which also received the rank of colonia.

After the death of the 2nd century Roman emperor Commodus, a civil war erupted, in which Berytus, and Sidon supported Pescennius Niger. While the city of Tyre  supported Septimius Severus, which led Niger to send Mauri javelin men and archers to sack the city. However, Niger lost the civil war, and Septimius Severus decided to show his gratitude for Tyre's support by making it the capital of Phoenice.

Diocletian (r. 284–305) separated the district of Batanaea and gave it to Arabia, while sometime before 328, when it is mentioned in the Laterculus Veronensis, Constantine the Great (r. 306–337) created the new province of Augusta Libanensis out of the eastern half of the old province, encompassing the territory east of Mount Lebanon.

Phoenice I and Phoenice Libanensis
Constantine's province was short-lived, but formed the basis of the re-division of Phoenice c. 394 into the Phoenice I or Phoenice Paralia ("coastal Phoenice"), and Phoenice II or Phoenice Libanensis (Φοινίκη Λιβανησία), with Tyre and Emesa as their respective capitals. In the Notitia Dignitatum, written shortly after the division, Phoenice I is governed by a consularis, while Libanensis is governed by a praeses, with both provinces under the Diocese of the East. This division remained intact until the Muslim conquest of the Levant in the 630s. Under the Caliphate, most of the two Phoenices came under the province of Damascus, with parts in the south and north going to the provinces of Jordan and Emesa respectively.

Ecclesiastical administration 
The ecclesiastical administration paralleled the political, but with some differences. The bishop of Tyre emerged as the pre-eminent prelate of Phoenice by the mid-3rd century. When the province was divided c. 394, Damascus, rather than Emesa, became the metropolis of Phoenice II. Both provinces belonged to the Patriarchate of Antioch, with Damascus initially outranking Tyre, whose position was also briefly challenged by the see of Berytus c. 450; after 480/1, however, the Metropolitan of Tyre established himself as the first in precedence (protothronos) of all the Metropolitans subject to Antioch.

Military
Since the time of Septimius Severus, it had been the practice to assign not more than two legions to each frontier province, and, although in some provinces one legion was sometimes deemed sufficient, the upper limit was not exceeded. This policy appears to have been continued during the third century AD, as seen in the case of Aurelian raising the garrisons of Phoenice to the normal strength of two legions.

Governors

Propraetorial Imperial Legates of Phoenicia

Consulares of Phoenicia
In the fourth century, as a whole, almost 30 governors of Phoenicia are known with 23 governors of Phoenicia being in office between 353 and 394.

Notes

References

Sources
 
 
 Schürer Emil, Vermes Geza, Millar Fergus, The history of the Jewish people in the age of Jesus Christ (175 B.C.-A.D. 135), Volume I, Edinburgh 1973, p. 243-266 (Survey of the Roman Province of Syria from 63 B.C. to A.D. 70).
 Linda Jones Hall, Roman Berytus: Beirut in late antiquity (2004)
 Martindale, J. R.; Jones, A. H. M, The Prosopography of the Later Roman Empire, Vol. I AD 260–395, Cambridge University Press (1971)

Roman governors of Syria
Roman governors of Syria
 
Roman governors of Syria
Roman governors of Syria
Lists of office-holders in ancient Rome
Syria

ca:Síria (província romana)#Governadors romans de Síria
pl:Syria (prowincja rzymska)

2nd-century establishments
7th-century disestablishments in Asia
Ancient Lebanon
Lebanon in the Roman era
Holy Land during Byzantine rule
Geography of Phoenicia
Provinces of the Roman Empire
Provinces of the Byzantine Empire
Roman Syria
Byzantine Syria
States and territories established in the 190s
States and territories disestablished in the 7th century